The Buckley Bay station is a former inter-city rail stop located in Buckley Bay, British Columbia across the island highway from the Denman Island ferry, between Bowser and Union Bay. The station was a stop on Via Rail's Dayliner service. Service ended in 2011 due to poor track conditions along the line.

References

External links 
Via Rail Station Description

Via Rail stations in British Columbia
Railway stations closed in 2011
Disused railway stations in Canada